Monkey Kettle was a poetry, prose and arts magazine based in Milton Keynes which ran between 1999 and 2014. Issues were usually 52 pages in length, printed in black and white with a colour front and back cover, and released twice a year. The collective of writers and artists behind Monkey Kettle also host regular local arts events, theatre productions and gigs in the town, and since the closure of the magazine have been releasing themed short-story compilation books.

Monkey Kettle made a selling point of mixing the work of local, less experienced writers with that of more established poets. Among those whose work was included in the magazine were: Barry Tebb (Children of Albion: Poetry of the Underground in Britain); Paul Robinson; Scott Laudati; Aoife Mannix (2001 Farrago London Slam Champion); Rogan Whitenails; Milton Keynes Poet Laureate Mark Niel; and award-winning visual artist Steve Groom.

External links
Monkey Kettle homepage.

1999 establishments in the United Kingdom
2014 disestablishments in the United Kingdom
Biannual magazines published in the United Kingdom
Defunct literary magazines published in the United Kingdom
Magazines established in 1999
Magazines disestablished in 2014
Poetry magazines published in the United Kingdom